The Identity Governance Framework was a project of the Liberty Alliance for standards to help enterprises determine and control how identity information is used, stored, and propagated using protocols such as LDAP, SAML, and WS-Trust and ID-WSF.

Purpose
The Identity Governance Framework (IGF) enables organizations to define policies that regulate and control the exchange of identity information between application systems both internally and with external partners. Identity information may include things like names, addresses, social security numbers or other information that would be otherwise considered related to an individual's identity.

The policy information is both useful to privacy auditors for assessing the use of identity information in applications and to policy enforcement systems for ensuring that appropriate use of identity information takes place.

History
IGF was originally announced by Oracle in November, 2006 as a joint initiative between CA, HP, Layer 7 Technologies, Novell, Oracle, Ping Identity, Securent, and Sun Microsystems.

In February, 2007, the initiative was transferred to the Liberty Alliance to take the draft proposal forward and fully develop the standard.

In July, 2007, Liberty announced completion of the Market Requirements Use Case documentation.

In June, 2008, Liberty Alliance announced publication of draft specifications for CARML and Privacy Constraints.

In November, 2008, Project Aristotle announced release 1.0 of the ArisID API  implementing the draft specifications for IGF. See project FAQ for more information.

In November, 2009, Liberty Alliance published final specifications of IGF components CARML (Client Attribute Requirements Markup Language) and IGF Privacy Constraints.

In December, 2009, Project Aristotle published ArisID, an implementation of IGF 1.0 release 1.1.

Liberty Alliance published final specifications of IGF components CARML (Client Attribute Requirements Markup Language) and IGF Privacy Constraints in the fall of 2009. Ongoing standards work is now being handled by the Kantara Initiative, LSM Working Group

An implementation of CARML and IGF Privacy Constraints was available through Project Aristotle , an Apache 2.0 Licensed open source project. Release 1.1 was released December 2009.

External links
Liberty Alliance Identity Governance Strategic Initiative
OpenLiberty Project Aristotle 
Oracle Technology Network IGF Page

Further reading 
 Sarbanes-Oxley Compliance Journal - January 3, 2007 - Open Initiative to Help Organizations Govern Identity Information Across Enterprise Applications
 Network World - July 30, 2007 - Identity Governance Framework sprints to the finish line
 Sarbanes-Oxley Compliance Journal - January 24, 2008 - Identity Governance Framework - Liberty Alliance's Initiative Addressing Privacy and SOX
 ZDNet Dana Blankenhorn Blog - November 19, 2008 - Will identity be open source?

Federated identity
Identity management
Information technology management